Vasil Etropolski (born 18 March 1959) is a Bulgarian fencer and fencing coach. He competed in the individual and team sabre events at the 1980 and 1988 Summer Olympics. He also won the 1983 sabre world championship. He is the twin brother of Khristo Etropolski, who also fenced for Bulgaria at the 1980 and 1988 Olympics.

At the New York Athletic Club he coached Stephen Kovacs, a sabre fencer who in 1989 won the United States Fencing Association (USFA) Under-17 saber championship, and in 1990 won the USFA Under-20 (Junior) saber championship. Kovacs later became a fencing coach, was charged with the sexual assault of two of his students, and died in prison in 2022.

References

External links
 

1959 births
Living people
Sportspeople from Sofia
Olympic fencers of Bulgaria
Fencers at the 1980 Summer Olympics
Fencers at the 1988 Summer Olympics
Bulgarian twins
Twin sportspeople
Bulgarian male sabre fencers
Universiade medalists in fencing
Universiade bronze medalists for Bulgaria
Medalists at the 1981 Summer Universiade
Medalists at the 1985 Summer Universiade